The Bible in a Year is an American podcast hosted by Mike Schmitz, a Catholic priest based in Duluth, Minnesota.

The podcast was created throughout 2021 and consisted of 365 episodes, released daily, discussing different aspects of the Bible and faith. It achieved a high level of popularity, becoming the most-downloaded podcast on Apple's platform for several weeks in early 2021, and again in early 2022. Biblical scholar Jeff Cavins was a regular guest of the podcast, introducing each new biblical time period with Fr. Schmitz.

The podcast is produced by Ascension Press. An Ascension staff member, Lauren Joyce, suggested that its success could be attributable to a need for faith during the COVID-19 pandemic, which limited in-person religious services.

See also 

 List of religion and spirituality podcasts

References 

Religion and spirituality podcasts
Catholic media

Christian podcasts